Leanne Ferrier (sometimes known as Leanne Tander, born 5 June 1980 in Sydney, Australia) is an Australian race car driver having raced cars such as Formula Ford, Formula 3 and in the Supercars Championship.

Career 

Ferrier started in karts in 1993, and progressed to Formula Ford in 1998.  After mixed success there, she moved up into V8 Supercar in 2001 with Garry Rogers Motorsport and 2002 with Fleetcare Racing. The next three seasons saw her race her father Mark's Mazda RX-7 in Improved Production racing, winning the Victorian and New South Wales championships in 2005, as well as driving in the Australian Production Car Championship in 2004 for Team Toyota Australia. In 2005, she had her first taste of a Formula 3 car, contesting three rounds that year, and moved to the Australian Formula Three Championship full-time in 2006, where she became the first female to win a race in 2007. After a pair of second places at Symmons Plains Raceway at the penultimate round, she went into the final round of the championship leading by four points.

After qualifying on pole position for both races at the season finale, at Oran Park Raceway, Leanne scored a third and a second in the two races, respectively, to narrowly miss out on the championship by just two points. It remains the best ever performance by a female driver in a National Australian circuit-racing Championship, and possibly the best ever by a female driver in a National or International F3 series.

In 2008, she remained in Australian F3 scoring four poles positions, five race wins and narrowly missed out on the title at the final round to James Winslow.

In 2007, with then husband Garth leading the Supercars standings, and Leanne having led the Australian Drivers Championship during the season, it was the first time that a married couple have simultaneously led Australian Motor Racing Championships.

In the 2009 V8 Supercar Series, Ferrier joined the Paul Cruikshank Racing racing for Ford. She also returned to the Fujitsu Series driving a TanderSport prepared Ford BF Falcon.

In 2010 Ferrier competed in the Touring Car Masters, driving a replica Ford Falcon XA GTHO Phase IV. She placed 5th in the series, having won the last race of Round 5, held at the Mount Panorama Circuit as a support category to the 2010 Bathurst 1000.

As of 2012, Leanne has been a regular contributor to entertainment and lifestyle website Live4.

Personal life

Ferrier married Australian racing driver Garth Tander in 2004. The couple separated in 2022. Ferrier has two children with Tander, a son, Sebastian, and a daughter, Scarlett.

Career results 

Note: Ferrier raced under her married name of Tander between 2005 and 2022.

Supercars Championship results

Complete Bathurst 1000 results

References

External links 
 Leanne Tander's Official Site
 Tander Sport
 Speedsport Germany
 V8 Supercar Statistics
 Driver Database profile
 Profile on Racing Reference

1980 births
Living people
Australian Formula 3 Championship drivers
Australian female racing drivers
Formula Ford drivers
Racing drivers from Sydney
Sportswomen from New South Wales
Toyota Racing Series drivers
Supercars Championship drivers
Garry Rogers Motorsport drivers